Carroll County is a county located in the western division of the U.S. state of Tennessee. As of the 2020 census, the population was 28,440. Its county seat is Huntingdon. The county was established by the Tennessee General Assembly on November 7, 1821, and was named for Governor William Carroll.

Geography

Carroll County Thousand Acre Recreational Lake
The Carroll County Thousand Acre Recreational Lake serves as a large water territory in Carroll County, Tennessee. Many locals have called the lake their home for years. Properties around the lake continue to boom and flourish. 

In 2022, the county attempted to change the name,  but after citizens of the county petitioning to keep the original name, they kept the Carrol County Thousand Acre Recreational Lake name the same. 

At the Carroll County Thousand Acre Recreational Lake, many visitors enjoy Sunset Grill, a family-friendly beach, Bass Masters, which is fishing tournament hosted by ESPN, various concerts throughout the boating season and host a firework show on the Fourth of July.

Adjacent counties
Henry County (northeast)
Benton County (east)
Decatur County (southeast)
Henderson County (south)
Madison County (southwest)
Gibson County (west)
Weakley County (northwest)

State protected areas
Harts Mill Wetland Wildlife Management Area (part)
Jarrell Switch Refuge
Natchez Trace State Forest (part)
Natchez Trace State Park (part)

Demographics

2020 census

As of the 2020 United States census, there were 28,440 people, 10,962 households, and 7,451 families residing in the county.

2000 census
As of the census of 2000, there were 29,475 people, 11,779 households, and 8,398 families residing in the county.  The population density was 49 people per square mile (19/km2).  There were 13,057 housing units at an average density of 22 per square mile (8/km2).  The racial makeup of the county was 87.68% White, 10.35% Black or African American, 0.24% Native American, 0.16% Asian, 0.02% Pacific Islander, 0.45% from other races, and 1.10% from two or more races.  1.41% of the population were Hispanic or Latino of any race.

There were 11,779 households, out of which 30.00% had children under the age of 18 living with them, 56.30% were married couples living together, 11.50% had a female householder with no husband present, and 28.70% were non-families. 25.80% of all households were made up of individuals, and 12.70% had someone living alone who was 65 years of age or older.  The average household size was 2.42 and the average family size was 2.90.

In the county, the population was spread out, with 23.20% under the age of 18, 8.40% from 18 to 24, 26.70% from 25 to 44, 24.40% from 45 to 64, and 17.30% who were 65 years of age or older.  The median age was 39 years. For every 100 females there were 92.30 males.  For every 100 females age 18 and over, there were 89.80 males.

The median income for a household in the county was $30,463, and the median income for a family was $36,880. Males had a median income of $29,904 versus $20,024 for females. The per capita income for the county was $16,251.  About 10.90% of families and 13.90% of the population were below the poverty line, including 17.90% of those under age 18 and 13.40% of those age 65 or over.

Transportation
The Carroll County Airport is a county-owned public-use airport located four nautical miles (4.6 mi, 7.4 km) northwest of the central business district of Huntingdon, Tennessee.

Media

Radio stations
WRQR-FM 105.5  "Today's Best Music with Ace & TJ in the Morning"
WTPR-AM 710 "The Greatest Hits of All Time"
WTPR-FM 101.7 "The Greatest Hits of All Time"
WEIO "100.9 The Farm"
WHDM 1440-AM 98.9-FM
WAJJ 89.3 FM Christian Radio "The J"

Newspapers
 The McKenzie Banner
 Carroll County News-Leader
 Tennessee Magnet Publications

Communities

City
McKenzie (small portions in Henry County and Weakley County)

Towns
Atwood
Bruceton
Clarksburg
Hollow Rock
Huntingdon (county seat)
McLemoresville
Trezevant

Unincorporated Communities
Buena Vista
Cedar Grove
 Christmasville
 Hopewell
Lavinia
Leach
Westport
Yuma

Politics

In the 21st century, Carroll County is overwhelmingly Republican. In general, the alignment of voters with the two major parties has shifted since the late 20th century, but Carroll County had a different history. Conservative whites in the upland and Deep South largely shifted away from the Democratic Party in the late 20th century to the Republican Party, but Carroll County had only briefly supported Democratic presidential candidates in the 20th century: 1912, when Southerner Woodrow Wilson was elected; from 1932-1948, for Franklin D. Roosevelt and Harry Truman during the Depression and years of World War II and after, and Southerners Lyndon B. Johnson in 1964, Jimmy Carter in 1976, and Bill Clinton in 1992-1996.  

But at the time of the American Civil War and for decades after, Carroll was the northernmost county in the Unionist Republican bloc, made up of Wayne, Henderson, Hardin and McNairy counties, within historically Democratic West Tennessee. The whites in this bloc were yeomen farmers who owned few slaves; most identified as Unionist. Historians note that the enclave developed this way because, unlike in the fertile Delta, this region of the Highland Rim had soils that were shallow, humus-poor and easily erodible. Settlers who were poor could acquire land here, as the area could not support the plantations more typical of Middle and West Tennessee, which were dependent on the labor of enslaved African Americans.

See also
National Register of Historic Places listings in Carroll County, Tennessee

References

Further reading
History of Carroll County Tennessee. Nashville: Turner Publishing (1987).

External links

 Carroll County Chamber of Commerce
 Carroll County, TNGenWeb - free genealogy resources for the county

 
1821 establishments in Tennessee
Populated places established in 1821
West Tennessee